Grand Island station, otherwise known as the Burlington Railroad Depot in Grand Island, Nebraska is a historic railroad station which served trains of the Chicago, Burlington and Quincy Railroad (Burlington Route). The Prairie style station was constructed in 1911. It was likely designed by Walter T. Krausch, who designed many CB&Q depots, however the documentation of the depot was lost in a 1922 fire.

In 1940, the station had three daily trains per direction. Railcar service was provided daily as far as Lincoln and Ravenna while The Adventureland and The General Custer each ran daily service from Kansas City to Billings via Grand Island. By 1947, the railcar service had ended and by May 1965, only one Kansas City to Billings train remained. Passenger service ended completely in 1969.

The station was listed on the National Register of Historic Places on December 2, 2014.

References 
 Acosta, Ruben A. Burlington Railroad Depot National Register of Historic Places Inventory-Nomination Form, 2014. On file at the National Park Service.

Railway stations in the United States opened in 1911
National Register of Historic Places in Hall County, Nebraska
Railway stations on the National Register of Historic Places in Nebraska
Former Chicago, Burlington and Quincy Railroad stations
1911 establishments in Nebraska
Railway stations closed in 1969
Former railway stations in Nebraska